Bhopal Sugar Industries Ground is a multi purpose stadium in Sehore, Madhya Pradesh, India. The ground is mainly used for organizing matches of football, cricket and other sports.

The stadium hosted one first-class matches  from 1985 when Madhya Pradesh cricket team played against Vidarbha cricket team. Since then the ground has hosted non-first-class matches.

References

External links
Cricinfo profile
Cricketarchive.com
 Wikimapia

Sports venues in Madhya Pradesh
Cricket grounds in Madhya Pradesh
Multi-purpose stadiums in India
Sehore
1984 establishments in Madhya Pradesh
Sports venues completed in 1984
20th-century architecture in India